Johann Daniel Hirter (5 May 1855, in Bern – 4 October 1926) was a Swiss politician and President of the Swiss National Council (1905/06). From 1906 to 1923, he presided over the Bank Council of the Swiss National Bank.

Further reading

External links 
 
 

1855 births
1926 deaths
People from Bern
Swiss Calvinist and Reformed Christians
Free Democratic Party of Switzerland politicians
Members of the National Council (Switzerland)
Presidents of the National Council (Switzerland)